Edward Hutchinson may refer to:

 Edward Hutchinson (mercer) (c. 1564–1632), mercer in Lincolnshire, England; father of five New England immigrants
 Edward Hutchinson, Sr. (1607-after 1669), signer of Portsmouth Compact, early Rhode Island settler
 Edward Hutchinson (captain) (1613–1675), signer of Portsmouth Compact; captain of the Massachusetts Bay Colony; died of wounds suffered during King Philip's War
 J. Edward Hutchinson (1914–1985), politician from the U.S. state of Michigan
 Edward L. Hutchinson (1864–?), attorney and a member of the Los Angeles, California, City Council
 Eddie Hutchinson (born 1982), footballer
 Edward Hutchinson (Hollyoaks), fictional character in the UK soap opera

See also
Ed Hutchinson (1867–1934), Major League Baseball player